Old Ford Lock is a paired lock and weir on the River Lee Navigation, in the London Borough of Tower Hamlets, England. It is at Fish Island in Old Ford and takes its name from the natural ford which used to cross the River Lea.

Tidal section
Old Ford Lock marks the start of the Hackney Cut – an artificial channel built in the 18th century to cut off a large loop in the natural channel. The natural river rejoins the Navigation at this point – below the lock, having travelled  from the Middlesex Filter Beds Weir, just below Lea Bridge; and passing to the east of the Navigation.

The Old River Lea (the natural channel), is joined by the River Lee Flood Relief Channel, and Dagenham Brook before connecting to the Bow Back Rivers, which join the tidal Bow Creek. Before the 1930s, there were tide gates installed on this channel to only permit boats to pass when the level in the (at that time) semi-tidal Lee Navigation and tidal Old River were the same. After the 1930s flood works on the Bow Back Rivers, and construction of the Carpenter's Road and Marshgate Lane locks, these – and the Pond Lane Flood Gates were redundant as this section was controlled by the new locks – and the (then) tidal lock at Bow Locks.

In 2000, Bow Locks were modified to keep the tide out; this reduced silting in this section of the canal – and made the water level completely controlled.

The Big Breakfast
For ten years, the neighbouring old Lock-keeper's cottages were used for television filming of The Big Breakfast, Channel 4's early morning show.  The three cottages, which were converted into a single house for the show, have since been compulsorily purchased as part of the Olympic Stadium development plans for the 2012 Summer Olympics.  As of 2017, the cottages have remained intact despite their 200-metre proximity to the stadium.

On the opposite bank from the lock-keeper's cottages was the former factory of Percy Dalton, a London peanut processor, notable for their production of roasted nuts in their shells. The company began at this site, in Dace Road, in the 1930s, but is now based in Suffolk.

Breaking and Entering

An old foundry next to The Big Breakfast house was used as the main movie location for Anthony Minghella's film Breaking and Entering, starring Jude Law and Juliette Binoche.

Public access 
Pedestrian and cycle access via the towpath which forms part of the Lea Valley Walk.

See also
Old Ford Lock (Regent's Canal)
Old Ford Three Locks (Hertford Union Canal)

The nearest London Overground station is Hackney Wick

The nearest Docklands Light Railway station is Pudding Mill Lane.

The nearest London Underground station is Bromley-by-Bow on the Hammersmith & City and District lines.

References

External links
 Old Ford Locks No 19 (Canalplan AC Gazetteer)
 Old Ford Locks – a history

Geography of the London Borough of Tower Hamlets
Locks of London
Locks of the Lee Navigation
Old Ford